Graeme Allen Brown OAM (born 9 April 1979) is an Australian former professional cyclist, who competed professionally between 2002 and 2016 for the ,  and  teams.

A former Australian Institute of Sport scholarship holder, Brown's greatest success as a road cyclist came in the Tour de Langkawi in Malaysia, including a record-breaking 5 stage wins in 2005 and winning the Points Classification in 2003 and 2005.

As a track cyclist he won a gold medal at the 2004 Summer Olympics in Athens as a member of the team pursuit (with Bradley McGee, Brett Lancaster, and Luke Roberts) in world record-breaking time of 3:58.233. He also won a gold medal with Stuart O'Grady for the Madison event at the 2004 Summer Olympics. At the 2002 Commonwealth Games in Manchester he won two gold medals: for the Team pursuit, and the Scratch Race.

Mark French accusations
At a hearing before the Court of Arbitration for Sport, cyclist Mark French gave sworn evidence that named Shane Kelly, Sean Eadie, Jobie Dajka, and Graeme Brown as riders who often injected vitamins and supplements in his room. 13 ampoules labelled EquiGen (equine growth hormone, an illegal doping agent), syringes and vitamins had been discovered by cleaners outside French's boarding room at the Australian Institute of Sport. On testing, some of the syringes were also found to contain the EquiGen hormone. French's lifetime ban was ultimately overturned on appeal, and Brown himself was never charged with any offense.

Personal life
Brown hails from Menai, an outer suburb of Sydney. He has three sons and a daughter. Recently married Brooke Colton.

Career achievements

Major results
Sources:

1996
 1st  Sprint, National Junior Track Championships
1997
 1st  Team pursuit, UCI Junior Track World Championships
 1st  Team pursuit, National Junior Track Championships
1998
 1st Stage 8 Commonwealth Bank Cycle Classic
1999
 UCI Track Cycling World Cup Classics
1st Team pursuit, Frisco
1st Team pursuit, Cali
 1st  Points race, National Track Championships
 1st Team pursuit, Oceania International Grand Prix
2000
 UCI Track Cycling World Cup Classics, Cali
1st Madison
2nd Team pursuit
 1st  Team pursuit, National Track Championships
2001
 1st Stage 1 Tour Down Under
 1st Stage 6 Giro delle Regioni
 1st Stage 6 Tour of Japan
 6th Circuito del Porto
2002
 1st Points race, UCI Track Cycling World Cup Classics, Moscow
 Commonwealth Games
1st  Team pursuit
1st  Scratch
 Tour de Langkawi
1st Stages 6 & 10
2003
 1st  Team pursuit, UCI Track Cycling World Championships
 1st  Madison, National Track Championships (with Mark Renshaw)
 Tour de Langkawi
1st  Points classification
1st Stages 5 & 7
 1st Points classification Perth Criterium Series
 1st Stage 6 Tour Down Under
2004
 Olympic Games
1st  Team pursuit
1st  Madison (with Stuart O'Grady)
2005
 Tour de Langkawi
1st  Points classification
1st Stages 1, 5, 7, 9 & 10
 2nd Coppa Bernocchi
 3rd Giro della Romagna
2006
 1st Tour de Rijke
 Deutschland Tour
1st Stages 4 & 8
 3rd Ronde van Midden-Zeeland
 5th Classic Haribo
 5th Scheldeprijs
 5th Noord-Nederland Tour
 8th International Grand Prix Doha
2007
 1st Stage 1 Tour of California
 1st Stage 3 Vuelta a Murcia
 1st Stage 2 Tour de Pologne
 2nd Overall Niedersachsen Rundfahrt
 2nd Ronde van het Groene Hart
 2nd Rund um Köln
 2nd Tour de Rijke
 4th Ronde van Midden-Zeeland
 5th Scheldeprijs
2008
 1st Trofeo Cala Millor-Cala Bona
 1st Stage 1 Vuelta a Murcia
 1st Stage 3 Tour Down Under
 2nd Trofeo Mallorca
 3rd Clásica de Almería
2009
 1st Nokere Koerse
 1st Omloop van het Houtland
 1st Stage 3 Tour Down Under
 Vuelta a Murcia
1st Stages 1 & 5
 2nd Trofeo Cala Millor
 2nd Clásica de Almería
 2nd Ronde van het Groene Hart
 2nd Dutch Food Valley Classic
 5th Batavus Prorace
2010
 1st Stage 1 Bay Classic Series
 1st Stage 8 Tour of Austria
 3rd Overall Delta Tour Zeeland
 3rd Clásica de Almería
 4th Ronde van het Groene Hart
 5th Rund um Köln
2011
 3rd Nokere Koerse
 10th Overall Delta Tour Zeeland
2012
 6th Handzame Classic
2013
 4th Omloop van het Houtland
2015
 8th Road race, Oceania Road Championships

Grand Tour general classification results timeline

Awards and honours
Brown was awarded the Order of Australia Medal (OAM) in the 2005 Australia Day Honours List. Other awards include NSW cyclist of the year.

References

External links

1979 births
Living people
Australian male cyclists
Cyclists at the 2000 Summer Olympics
Cyclists at the 2004 Summer Olympics
Cyclists at the 2008 Summer Olympics
Olympic gold medalists for Australia
Olympic cyclists of Australia
Cyclists at the 2002 Commonwealth Games
Sportspeople from Darwin, Northern Territory
Recipients of the Medal of the Order of Australia
Commonwealth Games gold medallists for Australia
Sportsmen from the Northern Territory
Olympic medalists in cycling
Australian Institute of Sport cyclists
Medalists at the 2004 Summer Olympics
UCI Track Cycling World Champions (men)
Commonwealth Games medallists in cycling
Australian track cyclists
Medallists at the 2002 Commonwealth Games